AMBD may refer to:

 America Must Be Destroyed, album by Gwar
 Monetary Authority of Brunei Darussalam, Brunei's central bank